Svante Grände (26 March 1947 – 14 October 1975) was a Swedish aid worker and guerrilla fighter in Latin America during the 1970s. He was one of two known Swedish citizens to be killed in the Dirty War in Argentina, the other being Dagmar Hagelin.

Biography
Grände was born in Tvååker, Sweden and was the fifth out of seven children of vicar Gustaf Grände and Anna-Carin Crona. He became an aid worker (part of UBV) in Chile in 1971 and after the 1973 coup d'état he joined the Revolutionary Left Movement (MIR), an armed resistance movement that fought dictator Augusto Pinochet. There he was given the title el Comandante Julio. After months on the run in the mountains of southern Chile he and other surviving guerrilla members were able to escape to Argentina. There Grände joined the People's Revolutionary Army (ERP) and became lieutenant in the beginning of 1975.

Grände was killed by the Argentine military in an ambush on 14 October 1975 in Tucumán Province, Argentina. He was at the time part of the mountain guerrilla company called "Ramón Rosa Jiménez".

See also
Dagmar Hagelin
List of solved missing person cases
List of unsolved murders

References

Further reading

External links
Radio documentary by Sveriges Radio
TV documentary by Sveriges Television

1947 births
1970s missing person cases
1975 deaths
Deaths by firearm in Argentina
Formerly missing people
Guerrillas killed in action
Male murder victims
Missing person cases in Argentina
People from Varberg Municipality
People killed in the Dirty War
Swedish emigrants to Argentina
Swedish people murdered abroad
Unsolved murders in Argentina